The early Russian system of government instituted by Peter the Great, which consisted of various state committees, each named Collegium with subordinate departments named Prikaz, was largely outdated by the 19th century.  The responsibilities of the Collegia were chosen very randomly and often overlapped.

Soon after Alexander I inherited the throne in 1801, he formed a Privy Committee (Негласный комитет) which consisted of Viktor Kochubey, Nikolay Novosiltsev, Pavel Stroganov and Adam Jerzy Czartoryski. Mikhail Speransky took an active part in the Committee, although he was not a formal member.

The reforms proposed by Speransky were to introduce a parliament and a State Council as legislative and executive bodies of the Tsar and to relieve the Governing Senate of these functions, transforming it to a kind of Supreme Court. Speransky even prepared the Constitution project. The reforms were stopped by 1810 because of the Napoleonic wars and growing resistance from conservative nobility, as voiced by Nikolai Karamzin.

On September 8, 1802 Alexander issued the Manifesto according to which following ministries had been founded on the basis of the Administration of State Affairs: 
 Military Land Forces
 Naval Forces
 Foreign Affairs
 Justice
 Internal Affairs
 Finances
 Commerce
 Education

The Manifesto facilitated the formation of the Russian state and unified the system of the executive power bodies.

The current Ministry of Defense, the Ministry of Foreign Affairs, the Ministry of Justice, the Ministry of Internal Affairs, the Ministry of Finances, the Ministry of Economic Development and Trade, the Ministry of Education of the Russian Federation are indirect successors of the Ministries founded according to the Manifesto of Alexander I.

See also
 Government reform of Peter I
 Government reforms of Alexander II of Russia

Government of the Russian Empire